1st Rossoshinskiy is a rural locality (a khutor) and the administrative center of Rossoshinskoye Rural Settlement of Zernogradsky District, Russia. The population was 911 as of 2010.

Geography 
The khutor is located on the Sredny Elbuzd River, 18 km from Zernograd.

Streets 
 Donskaya
 Zarechnaya
 Molodezhnaya
 Savovaya
 Stepnaya

Geography 
1st Rossoshinskiy is located 35 km south of Zernograd (the district's administrative centre) by road. Krayny is the nearest rural locality.

References

External links 
 ROSSOSHINSKOE AGRICULT ACCOMMODATION

Rural localities in Rostov Oblast